The members of the National Assembly of Zambia from 1996 until 2001 were elected on 18 November 1996. Of the 150 elected members, 131 were from the Movement for Multi-Party Democracy, five from the National Party, two from Agenda for Zambia and the Zambia Democratic Congress, together with ten independents.

List of members

Elected members

Replacements by by-elections

Non-elected members

Replacements

References

1996